Lake Forest School District 67 is an Illinois school district serving the Lake County city of Lake Forest. District 67 is composed of three elementary schools (Cherokee Elementary School, Everett Elementary School and Sheridan Elementary School) and one grades five-through-eight middle school (Deer Path Middle School).

References

External links
District home page

School districts in Lake County, Illinois
1862 establishments in Illinois
School districts established in 1862